The Chaldean Catholic Eparchy of Cairo is an eparchy of the Chaldean Catholic Church located in Cairo in Egypt.

History
 April 23, 1980: Established as Diocese of Cairo

Special churches
Minor Basilicas:
Cathedral of Our Lady of Fatima, Cairo

Leadership
 Bishops of Cairo (Chaldean rite)
 Bishop Ephrem Bédé, April 23, 1980 - January 18, 1984
 Bishop Youssef Ibrahim Sarraf, February 6, 1984 - December 31, 2009
Patriarchal Administrator of Cairo, Fr. Paulus Sati, August,29, 2018 - present

See also
List of Roman Catholic dioceses in Egypt
 List of cathedrals in Egypt

References
 GCatholic.org
 Catholic Hierarchy
Fr. Paulus Sati

Chaldean Catholic dioceses
Eastern Catholicism in Egypt
Assyrian Egyptian
Christianity in Cairo
Christian organizations established in 1980
Levantine-Egyptians
Iraqi diaspora in the Middle East